Donat Ertel (born 22 February 1948) is a German bobsledder. He competed in the four man event at the 1972 Winter Olympics.

References

External links
 

1948 births
Living people
German male bobsledders
Olympic bobsledders of West Germany
Bobsledders at the 1972 Winter Olympics
Sportspeople from Upper Bavaria
People from Rosenheim (district)